Alin Suciu is a Romanian coptologist and papyrologist. He is a senior researcher at the Göttingen Academy of Sciences and Humanities and docent in Early Christian Literature and Coptic Christianity, Faculty of Theology, University of Helsinki.

Biography
Suciu holds a PhD degree in religious studies from Université Laval, Québec. 
He has published articles on ancient manuscripts and biblical, patristic, and apocryphal texts in the Journal of Biblical Literature, Journal of Semitic Studies, Harvard Theological Review, Vigiliae Christianae, Le Muséon, and elsewhere. He maintains a scholarly blog entitled Patristics, Apocrypha, Coptic Literature and Manuscripts.

Suciu is a member of the Corpus dei Manoscritti Copti Letterari (CMCL), an international project which aims to reconstruct codicologically the dismembered Sahidic manuscripts of the library of the White Monastery, situated near Sohag in Upper Egypt. The CMCL project is currently hosted by the Hiob Ludolf Center for Ethiopian Studies]in Hamburg.

During the debate concerning the authenticity of the Gospel of Jesus' Wife papyrus, Suciu suggested that there are strong arguments which indicate that the fragment is a modern forgery.

He is the author of The Berlin-Strasbourg Apocryphon: A Coptic Apostolic Memoir (WUNT I, 370; Tübingen: Mohr Siebeck, 2017), which focuses on a Coptic apocryphal text previously known as the Gospel of the Savior. Suciu argues that the Berlin-Strasbourg Apocryphon is one of numerous "apostolic memoirs," a peculiar genre of Coptic literature, which consists of writings allegedly written by the apostles, often embedded in sermons attributed to famous church fathers.

Selected publications
 Suciu, Alin. "Revisiting the Literary Dossier of Stephen of Thebes: With Preliminary Editions of the Greek Redactions of the Ascetic Commandments," Adamantius 21 (2015) 301–325.
 Suciu, Alin. "On a Bilingual Copto-Arabic Manuscript of 4 Ezra and the Reception of this Pseudepigraphon in Coptic Literature," Journal for the Study of the Pseudepigrapha 25.1 (2015) 3-22.
 Suciu, Alin. "The Sahidic Version of Jacob of Serugh's Memrā on the Ascension of Christ," Le Muséon 128 (2015) 49–83.
 Suciu, Alin. "Coptic Scribes and Manuscripts. Dated and Datable Codices from the Monastery of Apa Shenoute. I: The Codices of the Scribe Victor, the Son of Shenoute (First Half of the 12th Century)," Journal of Coptic Studies 16 (2014) 195–215.
 Suciu, Alin. "A Coptic Fragment from the History of Joseph the Carpenter in the Collection of Duke University Library," Harvard Theological Review 106:1 (2013) 93–104.
 Suciu, Alin. "Ps.-Theophili Alexandrini Sermo de Cruce et Latrone. Edition of Pierpont Morgan M595 with Parallels and Translation," Zeitschrift für Antikes Christentum – Journal of Ancient Christianity 16 (2012) 181–225.
 Suciu, Alin - Thomassen, Einar. "An Unknown ‘Apocryphal’ Text from the White Monastery," in P. Buzi – A. Camplani (eds.), Christianity in Egypt: Literary Production and Intellectual Trends. Studies in Honor of Tito Orlandi (Studia Ephemeridis ‘Augustinianum,’ 125; Rome: Istituto Patristico Augustinianum, 2011) 477–499.

References

External links
 Alin Suciu's page on Academia.edu
 Alin Suciu's page on Ad Astra - An Online Project for the Romanian Scientific Community
 Alin Suciu's blog - Patristics, Apocrypha, Coptic Literature and Manuscripts
 Un manuscris antic prezinta informatii surprinzatoare despre Iisus. Ce spune istoricul Alin Suciu
 Tezaurul literaturii creştine în limba coptă. Interview with Alin Suciu (in Romanian) 
 Alte comori ale creştinismului egiptean de limbă coptă. Interview with Alin Suciu (in Romanian) 
 Un cercetator roman a demontat un fals ordinar de la Harvard: Asa-zisa “evanghelie a soţiei lui Iisus”. A hoax at Harvard University: the so-called Gospel of Jesus’s wife

Living people
1978 births
Coptologists
Papyrologists
Patristic scholars
People from Oradea
Université Laval alumni
Romanian expatriates in Germany